Kaugama is a Local Government Area in the north of Jigawa State, Nigeria. Its headquarters are in the town of Kaugama.

It has an area of 883 km and a population of 127,956 at the 2006 census.

The postal code of the area is 730.

References

 Elleman Tijjani, Elleman hausawa, Dakayyawa, Hadin, Mand'a.

Local Government Areas in Jigawa State